The European Parliament election of 1994 took place on 12 June 1994.

Forza Italia was by far the largest party in Veneto with 31.5%, while Lega Nord came second with 15.7% and the Italian People's Party third with 13.6%.

Results

* = In alliance with Lega Autonomia Veneta, the Sardinian Action Party, Union for South Tyrol, etc.Source: Regional Council of Veneto

Elections in Veneto
1994 elections in Italy
European Parliament elections in Italy
Veneto